Dying Happy was the fifth of five albums of home-made recordings, released by Stephen Jones under the name Baby Bird in 1996. It was originally a limited edition release, but is now available as part of the 2002 CD box set The Original Lo-Fi.

Critical reception

"Halfway between songs and instrumentals, some of the tracks on Dying Happy just don't work at all, but some of them are riveting." – The Times

Track listing
All tracks written and composed by Stephen Jones.

"Losing My Hair" – 3:42
"Tomorrow's Gone" – 5:36
"Petrol Cigarette" – 2:34
"When Everyone Speaks English, the World Will Explode" – 6:03
"Homesick Satellites" – 2:34
"TV" – 3:07
"The Unemployable Rub Oil on Her Coffin" – 2:20
"Grandma Begs to Be 18 Again" – 2:34
"It's Alright Dad, Isn't It" – 2:35
"Lead Cloud" – 2:34
"Cheap Astronaut" – 5:15
"Metal Waterpistol" – 3:04

Personnel
Stephen Jones – recording, artwork 
Colin Bradley – editing
Al Levy – photography
Andrej Glusgold – photography
DED Associates – artwork

References

1996 albums
Babybird albums